Paul Philip Craig,  (born 27 September 1951) is a British legal scholar, specialising in administrative and European Union law. He was Professor of English Law at the University of Oxford from 1998 to 2019, and is now emeritus professor.

Education and background 
He was also a Fellow of Worcester College, Oxford (1976–1998) and then of St John's College, Oxford.

He was educated at Worcester College, Oxford, where he took his MA and BCL. He stayed at Worcester, and was made a Fellow in 1976. He remained a Fellow until his move to St John's in 1998.

Career 
He is the author of a number of legal textbooks the most well known of which (EU Law: Text, Cases and Materials) was published in its 5th edition by Oxford University Press in September 2011.

He currently teaches 5 week courses in Administrative Law and European Union Law at the Indiana University School of Law-Bloomington. He also lectures in Constitutional Law at the University of Oxford, and a Masters Course at the University of Melbourne, Australia.

He is a member of the Whitney R. Harris World Law Institute's International Council.

Honours
In 1998, Craig was elected a Fellow of the British Academy (FBA), the United Kingdom's national academy for the humanities and social sciences. He was appointed an honorary Queen's Counsel on 3 May 2000.

Selected works

External links
Paul Craig at Oxford Law.
Paul Craig at St John's College.

References

1951 births
Living people
Fellows of Worcester College, Oxford
Fellows of St John's College, Oxford
Alumni of Worcester College, Oxford
Oxford University Press Delegate
Scholars of administrative law
English legal scholars
Statutory Professors of the University of Oxford
Legal scholars of the University of Oxford
Honorary King's Counsel
Fellows of the British Academy